In enzymology, the committed step (also known as the first committed step) is an effectively irreversible enzymatic reaction that occurs at a branch point during the biosynthesis of some molecules.
As the name implies, after this step, the molecules are "committed" to the pathway and will ultimately end up in the pathway's final product. The first committed step should not be confused with the rate-determining step, which is the slowest step in a reaction or pathway. However, it is sometimes the case that the first committed step is in fact the rate-determining step as well.

Regulation
Metabolic pathways require tight regulation so that the proper compounds get produced in the proper amounts. Often, the first committed step is regulated by processes such as feedback inhibition and activation. Such regulation ensures that pathway intermediates do not accumulate, a situation that can be wasteful or even harmful to the cell.

Examples of enzymes that catalyze the first committed steps of metabolic pathways
 Phosphofructokinase 1 catalyzes the first committed step of glycolysis.
 LpxC catalyzes the first committed step of lipid A biosynthesis.
 8-amino-7-oxononanoate synthase catalyzes the first committed step in plant biotin synthesis.
 MurA catalyzes the first committed step of peptidoglycan biosynthesis.
Aspartate transcarbamoylase catalyzes the committed step in the pyrimidine biosynthetic pathway in E. coli.
3-deoxy-D-arabinose-heptulsonate 7-phosphate synthase catalyses the first committed step of the shikimate pathway responsible for the synthesis of the aromatic amino acids Tyrosine, Tryptophan and Phenylalanine in plants, bacteria, fungi and some lower eukaryotes.
Citrate synthase catalyzes the addition of acetyl-CoA to oxaloacetate and is the first committed step of the Citric Acid Cycle.
Acetyl-CoA carboxylase catalyzes the irreversible carboxylation of acetyl-CoA to malonyl-CoA in the first committed step of fatty acid biosynthesis.
Glucose-6-phosphate dehydrogenase catalyzes the conversion of G6P into 6-phosphogluconolactone to produce NADPH in the first and committed step of the pentose phosphate pathway.

Other uses
The term has also been applied to other processes that involve a series of steps. For example, the binding of egg and sperm can be thought of as the first committed step in metazoan fertilization.

See also
 Enzyme catalysis
 Negative feedback

References

External links
 Glycolysis Regulation at Cliffsnotes.com

Enzymes
Catalysis
Biomolecules
Biosynthesis